Antonio Bordon is a Paraguayan handball coach of the Paraguay national team.

References

Living people
Year of birth missing (living people)
Handball coaches
Place of birth missing (living people)
Handball in Paraguay